The Album is the fourth studio album by Mexican-American Chicano rap recording artist Lil Rob from San Diego, California. It was released on September 3, 2002 via Upstairs Records.

Track listing

Charts

References

2002 albums
Lil Rob albums
Gangsta rap albums by American artists